Derrick Brown (born 21 November 1963) is a male retired English athlete who specialized in the long jump. His career best jump was 8.00 metres, and his best international result was a fifth place at the 1986 Commonwealth Games.

Career 
As a junior athlete, Brown had a personal best jump of 7.54 metres, achieved in June 1982 in Hull. The next year, he won his first medals in senior competitions, with a bronze medal at the Amateur Athletics Association (AAA) Championships, behind guest jumper Mike Conley, Sr. and Fred Salle, and a gold medal at the UK Championships. UK Championship gold medals followed in 1984, 1986 and 1988. At the AAA Indoor Championships, he won a gold medal in 1984 and silver medals in 1985 and 1987, and at the AAA Championships, he won silver in 1985 and gold in 1986.

Internationally, he competed for England at the 1986 Commonwealth Games, where he finished fifth with a jump of 7.65 metres.in Edinburgh, Scotland. His career best jump was 8.00 metres, achieved in July 1985 in Viareggio. He did have one wind-assisted 8.12 result from June 1986 in Loughborough.

References

1968 births
Living people
English male long jumpers
Commonwealth Games competitors for England
Athletes (track and field) at the 1986 Commonwealth Games